Three ships of the Royal Navy have borne the name HMS Princess Amelia, after either Princess Amelia, daughter of George II or Princess Amelia, daughter of George III.  Another ship was planned but never completed:

She was renamed HMS Princess Amelia in 1727 and was broken up in 1752.
She was renamed HMS Princess Amelia in 1755 and was broken up in 1757. 
  was an 80-gun third rate launched in 1757.  She was loaned to HM Customs in 1788 and sold in 1818.
 HMS Princess Amelia was to have been a 74-gun third rate. She was laid down in 1799 and cancelled in 1800.

See also
 
 
 Post Office Packet Service packet ship 

Royal Navy ship names